Mark Vanmoerkerke (18 September 1952 – 26 October 2022) was a Belgian entrepreneur and politician. A member of the Christian People's Party, he served in the Senate from 1994 to 1995.

Vanmoerkerke died on 26 October 2022 at the age of 70.

References

1952 births
2022 deaths
Members of the Senate (Belgium)
20th-century Belgian politicians
People from Ostend